Razlog Cove is a 2.1 km wide cove indenting for 1.7 km the north coast of Greenwich Island in the South Shetland Islands, Antarctica.  It is bounded by Archar Peninsula to the south, and Express Island to the northeast, and is entered between Duff Point and the northern extremity of Express Island.

The cove is named after the town of Razlog in southwestern Bulgaria.

Location

Maps
 L.L. Ivanov et al. Antarctica: Livingston Island and Greenwich Island, South Shetland Islands. Scale 1:100000 topographic map. Sofia: Antarctic Place-names Commission of Bulgaria, 2005.
 L.L. Ivanov. Antarctica: Livingston Island and Greenwich, Robert, Snow and Smith Islands. Scale 1:120000 topographic map.  Troyan: Manfred Wörner Foundation, 2009.

External links
 Razlog Cove. SCAR Composite Antarctic Gazetteer
 Bulgarian Antarctic Gazetteer. Antarctic Place-names Commission. (details in Bulgarian, basic data in English)

External links
 Razlog Cove. Copernix satellite image

Coves of Greenwich Island